Anarta arenbergeri is a species of moth of the family Noctuidae. It has only been recorded from Turkey and Israel.

Adults are on wing from May to July and again in September. There are probably two generations per year.

External links
 Hadeninae of Israel
 Anarta arenbergeri Pronunciation in Different Languages

arenbergeri
Moths of the Middle East
Moths described in 1974